Charles Y. Audenried Junior High School was an historic school building located in the Grays Ferry neighborhood of Philadelphia, Pennsylvania.

History and features
Designed by Irwin T. Catharine and built in 1930-1931, it was a three-story, fifteen-bay, brick building that was erected on a raised basement in the Colonial Revival-style. It featured two projecting entrances with stone surrounds, a central entrance with four Doric order columns, projecting brick pilasters, and a brick parapet.  The listed building has been demolished and replaced with the modern Universal Audenried Charter High School.

It was added to the National Register of Historic Places in 1988.

References

School buildings on the National Register of Historic Places in Philadelphia
Colonial Revival architecture in Pennsylvania
School buildings completed in 1931
South Philadelphia